The Demy was a Scottish gold coin struck under reign of James I of Scotland and based on the English half Noble coin. With a face value 9 Scottish shillings the coin was later replaced with the Lion coin by James II of Scotland

References

Bibliography

Coins of Scotland